The 1936 Minnesota gubernatorial election took place on November 3, 1936. Farmer–Labor Party candidate Elmer Austin Benson defeated Republican Party of Minnesota challenger Martin A. Nelson.  The Democrats did not field a candidate. Magnus Johnson unsuccessfully ran for the Farmer-Labor nomination.

Results

See also
 List of Minnesota gubernatorial elections

External links
 http://www.sos.state.mn.us/home/index.asp?page=653
 http://www.sos.state.mn.us/home/index.asp?page=657

Minnesota
Gubernatorial
1936
November 1936 events